The Bhangi Misl (Punjabi pronunciation: [pə̃˨ŋɡiː mɪsəl]) was a large and powerful Sikh Misl headquartered in Amritsar. It was founded in the early 18th century by Sardar Chhajja Singh Dhillon, who was baptised by Banda Singh Bahadur. The misl received its name "Bhangi" because Chhajja Singh and his soldiers frequently used the herbal intoxicant bhang (drink made from cannabis sativa). It was a first misl to established a Khalsa Raj and publish Khalsa currency coins. The Bhangi Kingdom/Misl was founded by Dhillon Jats.

List of Sardars (Chiefs) 

 Chhajja Singh Bhangi
 Bhima (Bhuma) Singh
 Hari Singh
 Jhanda Singh
 Ganda Singh
 Charhat Singh Dhillon (died nearly immediately)
 Desu Singh Dhillon
 Gulab Singh Dhillon
 Gurdit Singh Dhillon

Expanse of Bhangi Misl
It grew in strength and territory to cover an area from Gujrat to Multan and emerged as the strongest power in the western Punjab region. However, deaths among the leadership during the late 1760s reduced the Misl's power. On 16 April 1765, the Bhangi sardars Gujjar Singh and Lehna Singh Kahlon, allied with Sobha Singh of the Kanhaiya Misl, conquered Lahore. They did not plunder the city as it was the birthplace of Guru Ram Das, the fourth Sikh guru.

Decline of power
The Bhangi misl engaged in numerous power struggles with the Sukerchakia Misl until they were severely weakened at the Battle of Basin and the loss of Lahore to Ranjit Singh in 1799.

Bhangi Misl held the possession of Zamzama, the famous cannon, which was at the time named Bhangi Toap, Bhangianwala Toap and Bhangian di Top, names it retains to this day.

Gallery

See also 

 Bhang
 Cannabis and Sikhism

References

Misls
Cannabis and Sikhism